State Route 101 (SR 101) is a  state highway in the northwestern part of the U.S. state of Georgia. It travels in a south-north orientation between the Atlanta metropolitan area and the Alabama state line. Its routing passes through portions of Carroll, Paulding, Polk, and Floyd counties. It connects the Villa Rica and Rome areas of the state.

Route description

SR 61 splits off, while SR 101 travels northwest into Paulding County. The only major intersection in the county is with SR 113/SR 120 (Buchanan Highway), in the unincorporated community of Union. SR 101/SR 113 travel concurrently. In Polk County, the road meets US 278/SR 6, southeast of Rockmart. The four highways travel concurrent to the northwest, and enter Rockmart. They bypass the main part of town to the east, northeast, and north. On the northeast corner of the city, SR 113 splits off to the northeast. At Piedmont Avenue, SR 101 splits off to the north-northwest. This intersection also marks the eastern terminus of US 278 Bus./SR 6 Bus. SR 101 continues to the northwest and enters Floyd County. It curves to an almost-due-north orientation and enters Rome. In the city, it has an incomplete interchange with US 411 north/SR 20 east, just east of Georgia Northwestern Technical College; there is no access from SR 101 to US 411 south/SR 20 west. The route travels to the north and curves to the northwest to intersect US 27/SR 1/SR 53 (Turner McCall Boulevard). It crosses over the Etowah and Oostanaula rivers. It passes Barron Stadium and Floyd Medical Center, before it meets its northern terminus, an intersection with US 27/SR 1/SR 20, farther along in the city. SR 101 is not part of the National Highway System, a system of roadways important to the nation's economy, defense, and mobility.

Major intersections

See also

References

External links

 Georgia Roads (Routes 101-120)

101
Transportation in Carroll County, Georgia
Transportation in Paulding County, Georgia
Transportation in Polk County, Georgia
Transportation in Floyd County, Georgia
Villa Rica, Georgia
Rome, Georgia